Mor Ivanios Kuriakose(born June 9, 1964) is a Syriac Orthodox bishop, currently auxiliary Metropolitan of Knanaya Archdiocese in charge of the Ranni region.

Education

Postgraduate education from Mahatma Gandhi University, Kottayam.
Under Graduation from Kerala University.
Theological Studies from Vidyajyoti College of Theology, New Delhi.

References

Living people
Syriac Orthodox Church bishops
Indian Oriental Orthodox Christians
1964 births